Rajiv Gandhi Institute of Medical Sciences, Adilabad also RIMS Adilabad is a medical institute located in Adilabad. It is affiliated to Kaloji Narayana Rao University of Health Sciences.

History
It was established by Y. S. Rajasekhara Reddy, the Chief Minister of Andhra Pradesh (2004–2009) in the year 2008.
The first batch was started in 2008.

Intake
The present intake is to go up by 125 seats from 2019–20, taking the total to 525 seats.

References

Medical colleges in Telangana
Adilabad district
2008 establishments in Andhra Pradesh
Educational institutions established in 2008